Samuel Henry Carr was a Canadian politician who represented Rosthern in the 12th sitting of the Legislative Assembly of Saskatchewan.

He won a byelection triggered by the resignation of Walter Tucker.

References 

20th-century Canadian legislators
People from Rosthern, Saskatchewan
Saskatchewan Liberal Party MLAs